Monasa is a genus of puffbird in the Bucconidae family.

The genus was introduced by the French ornithologist Louis Vieillot in 1816 with the black nunbird (Monasa atra) as the type species. The generic name is from the Ancient Greek monas meaning "solitary".

The genus contains four species:

References

 
Bird genera
Taxa named by Louis Jean Pierre Vieillot
Taxonomy articles created by Polbot